Saúl "La Cobra" Montana (born November 23, 1970) is a Mexican former professional boxer. Montana is the former IBA, NABA, WBC Mundo Hispano, WBC Continental Americas Champion at Cruiserweight, NBA, and Mexican National Champion at Heavyweight. He also challenged once for the IBF cruiserweight title in 2000.

Professional career

Montana turned pro in 1988 and won the Mexican Light heavyweight title by knocking out an undefeated Isaias Lucero(21-0).

WBA Light Heavyweight Champion
In November 1993, Saul lost a shot at WBA Light heavyweight Champion, Virgil Hill in 1993. The fight was close until it was stopped.

Move to Cruiserweight
Montana moved to cruiserweight and lost to former Olympian Torsten May in 1995 and Uriah Grant in 1996.

IBF Cruiserweight Championship
Montana then beat Kenny Keene and then Grant in a rematch, setting up a shot at Vassiliy Jirov for his IBF Cruiserweight title. Montana lost via TKO and moved up to heavyweight in 2001.

Move to Heavyweight
He had success at Heavyweight, upsetting the undefeated China Smith for the NBA World heavyweight title and then defending that title by winning their rematch. 

On September 11, 2010, he lost a twelve-round decision to Johnathon Banks for Johnathon's NABF Heavyweight title.

During his boxing career Montana has fought many famous fighters like Virgil Hill (twice), Uriah Grant (twice), David Tua, Dennis Bakhtov, Johnathon Banks, Torsten May, Tye Fields, Sinan Şamil Sam, Grigory Drozd, and James Toney.

Professional boxing record

References

External links

1970 births
Living people
Sportspeople from Acapulco
Boxers from Guerrero
Mexican male boxers
Light-heavyweight boxers
Cruiserweight boxers
Heavyweight boxers